Sycozoa is a genus of tunicates belonging to the family Holozoidae.

The species of this genus are found in Southern Hemisphere.

Species

Species:

Sycozoa anomala 
Sycozoa arborescens 
Sycozoa brevicauda 
Sycozoa cavernosa 
Sycozoa cerebriformis 
Sycozoa pedunculata 
Sycozoa pulchra
Sycozoa seiziwadai 
Sycozoa sigillinoides

References

Tunicates
Taxa named by René Lesson